William of St. Barbara or William of Ste Barbe (died 1152) was a medieval Bishop of Durham.

Life

From William's name, it is presumed that he was a native of Sainte-Barbe-en-Auge in Calvados in Normandy (Neustria). He was a canon of York Minster in 1128. He was Dean of York by December 1138.

William was elected to the see of Durham on 14 March 1143 and consecrated on 20 June 1143. He was elected in opposition to William Cumin who had been intruded into the see by King David I of Scotland in 1141. Cumin was never consecrated and by 1143 had been excommunicated by Pope Innocent II who also ordered a new election to be held at York Minster. It was this election which selected William of St. Barbara. However, the new bishop was not able to enter Durham right away, and he was enthroned either on 18 October 1144 or shortly thereafter.

Troubles continued in Durham, and the bishop was unable to attend the Council of Rheims in 1148, which led to a suspension by the pope for inattendance. William supported Henry Murdac in the disputed election to the archbishopric of York, and it was probably Murdac who arranged for the suspension to be lifted. William also supported the Cistercians and the Augustinians, which perturbed  his cathedral chapter which was made up of Benedictine monks. He died 13 November 1152. A grave identified as his was excavated in the 19th century in the chapter house of  Durham Cathedral.

Citations

References

 
 
 
 
 
 
 

12th-century English Roman Catholic bishops
Bishops of Durham
Deans of York
Anglo-Normans
1152 deaths
Year of birth unknown